The Wisconsin Little Ten Conference is a high school athletic conference in south-eastern Wisconsin.  The 2016–17 school year will be the last for the WLT due to the redrawing of conferences by the WIAA, unless one of the newly drawn conferences assumes the name.

Current members

Conference Sports
There are 15 sports in the Wisconsin Little Ten Conference.
Men's Baseball
Men's/Women's Basketball
Men's/Women's Bowling
Men's Hockey
Men's/Women's Cross Country
Women's Dance
Men's Football
Men's/Women's Golf
Men's/Women's Soccer
Women's Softball
Men's/Women's Swimming
Men's/Women's Tennis
Men's/Women's Track
Women's Volleyball
Men's Wrestling

Future Realignment
On April 19, 2016, the WIAA announced the approval of conference realignment in Southeast Wisconsin.  The realignment will shift all of the conference schools to different conferences, thus signaling the end of the WLT (unless one of the newly formed conferences decides to assume the WLT name).  The schools will be realigned as follows:

Beaver Dam—Badger Conference
Watertown—Badger Conference
Hartford Union—North Shore Conference
Oconomowoc—Classic 8 Conference
Slinger—North Shore Conference
West Bend East—North Shore Conference
West Bend West—North Shore Conference
Wisconsin Lutheran—Woodland Conference

See also
 List of high school athletic conferences in Wisconsin

References

External links
 WisconsinLittleTenConference.org

Wisconsin high school sports conferences
High school sports conferences and leagues in the United States